Gustav Abel (1902–1963) was an Austrian art director.

Selected filmography
 The Silent Partner (1939)
 Father For a Night (1939)
 A Woman Has Fallen (1941)
 The Hero of Venice (1941)
 The Fourth Commandment (1950)
 No Sin on the Alpine Pastures (1950)
 Shame on You, Brigitte! (1952)
 Arena of Death (1953)
 The Spendthrift (1953)
 The First Kiss (1954)

References

Bibliography

External links

1902 births
1963 deaths
Austrian art directors
Film people from Vienna